is a Japanese dōjin soft visual novel series produced by 07th Expansion. Its first episode debuted at Comiket 72 for Windows in August 2007. The story focuses on a group of eighteen people on a secluded island for a period of two days, and the mysterious murders that befall them. Readers are challenged to discern whether the murders were committed by a human or some other, supernatural source, as well as the method and motive behind them. The eight main Umineko games are split into two sets of four, which are considered the third and fourth titles in the When They Cry series, preceded by the two sets of Higurashi When They Cry games and followed by Ciconia When They Cry.

Square Enix, Ichijinsha, Kadokawa Shoten, and ASCII Media Works all published various manga adaptations of the series. It was adapted into an anime television series, which aired from July to December 2009. A series of novels written by Ryukishi07 are published by Kodansha Box. A fighting game based on the franchise, Umineko: Golden Fantasia, was released by 07th Expansion in December 2010.

Gameplay
Umineko When They Cry is a murder mystery visual novel, and as such conveys its story primarily through text-based narration and dialogue supplemented by visual and audio elements such as character sprites, background music, and sound effects. It is described as a "sound novel" by 07th Expansion, due to the game's greater focus on creating atmosphere through audio elements rather than visual aspects. The original releases contain no voice acting for the characters. Umineko is almost entirely linear and contains no interactive gameplay elements, with the exception of small portions of its final entry, Twilight of the Golden Witch. Besides advancing text, players may also access the Tips Mode, allowing them to read various supplementary information regarding the characters and story. Each episode also contains two epilogues which are successively unlocked, which are continuations of the main story that often contain important plot points.

Despite the lack of interactive gameplay elements, Umineko is framed as a game between the author and the reader, with difficulty ratings given in the descriptions for each episode. This refers to the difficulty of the mysteries in each episode, which the reader is intended to actively try to solve. Several story elements are introduced through the course of the story to aid readers in solving the mystery along with the story's protagonist.

Synopsis

Plot

Returning after a six-year absence, Kinzo's grandson Battler becomes reacquainted with the legend of the "Golden Witch" Beatrice, who supposedly gave Kinzo ten tons of gold to restore his financially crippled family in the past. Beside her portrait is a riddle-like epitaph, which is believed to grant the rumored gold and the succession of the headship to the solver. A typhoon traps the eighteen people on the island, and occult-like murders occur in accordance with the epitaph, often in ways that seem impossible for a human.

At the end of the first game, the witch Beatrice seemingly kills and revives everyone. Refusing to acknowledge the existence of magic, Battler is seemingly sent to a parallel dimension, from which events on Rokkenjima can be seen. In subsequent episodes he faces Beatrice in games of logic, with the murders repeating themselves in different ways each time, and is tasked to explain them all with human tricks. Over the course of the story, Battler gradually comes to understand magic as an adornment of reality with fantasy, used by several individuals as a coping mechanism for their harsh life situations, and how this is related to Beatrice.

In the original visual novel, the solution is never made completely clear, with the need for the reader to solve it personally and the importance of the truth being contained within the cat box maintained by the narrative. However, in the manga adaption of the final two episodes, the true identity of Beatrice is revealed as Kinzo's illegitimate child Sayo Yasuda, who plays the role of two of the family's servants, Shannon and Kanon. Having begun work for the Ushiromiya family at age nine, Sayo was ostracized by the older servants and found comfort in the creation of imaginary friends through "magic". They also experienced severe gender dysphoria due to their failure to develop standard female sexual characteristics during puberty. Sayo developed a close friendship and childhood crush on Battler, but suppressed their feelings for him during his absence and eventually entered a relationship with his cousin George as Shannon. Another cousin, Jessica, also developed a crush on Kanon, which Sayo partially wanted to reciprocate.

With the aid of Genji, the head servant, Sayo solves the epitaph and gains possession of the legendary gold and a massive number of explosives under the island, both remnants of an old World War II military base that made contact with the Italians. They also discover their relation to Kinzo, Compounded by the realization that a relationship with any of the cousins would be incest, and disgusted by the Ushiromiya family's sins, Sayo is driven to despair and begins planning a mass murder-suicide using the resources at their disposal. Several possible scenarios are thrown into the sea as message bottles with the hope that someone in the future would come to understand the truth, which forms the basis of the first two games. Sayo's plan ends with the detonation of the explosives, which would destroy all evidence and leave only their fictitious tales standing. At the same time, Sayo is unable to fully accept this course of action and makes it possible for another person, ideally Battler, to solve the epitaph and stop them.

However, on the actual family conference of 1986, the epitaph is solved by the adults of the family, and as such, Sayo's plan does not take place. An argument breaks out over the possession of the gold, and Battler's parents, Rudolf and Kyrie, carry out a massacre of the family. Battler's aunt Eva survives the massacre after killing Rudolf and Kyrie in self-defense; Sayo and Battler also survive, but Sayo commits suicide by drowning at sea. Battler, who attempted to rescue Sayo, suffers brain damage and loses his identity as Battler, but retains his fragmented memories. He takes on a new identity under the name Toya Hachijo, and his attempts to piece together the truth of the incident lead him to pen the tales of subsequent games. In the meantime, Battler's identity which 'died' in 1986 finds himself awake in Purgatory, where he meets Sayo as Beatrice, beginning his experiences in the parallel dimension.

Story arcs

Umineko no Naku Koro ni
 consists of the first four arcs of the series. They are referred to as the Question Arcs and introduce the world of the story and its mysteries. Each arc contains all the previous ones.

Episode 1: Legend of the Golden Witch (2007)
The chapter introduces the player to the main setting for the series as the Ushiromiya family gather on the island of Rokkenjima for their annual family conference. The player is familiarized with the island's 18 residents (consisting of the Ushiromiya family and servants) as well as the legend of the Golden Witch, Beatrice. As the story progresses, people on the island are murdered, and the family is taunted by letters that claim to be from the witch Beatrice, who takes responsibility for the murders and intends to take back everything of the Ushiromiya family.

Episode 2: Turn of the Golden Witch (2007)
The chapter introduces the "meta-world", where Battler is locked into a battle of twisted logic with the witch Beatrice as the murders on the island repeat in a different way. Beatrice also arrives on the island as its 19th resident, and fantastical elements are introduced into the story. The chapter also focuses on George and Jessica's relationships with the Ushiromiya family servants, Shannon and Kanon.

Episode 3: Banquet of the Golden Witch (2008)
The third chapter continues the repeating murders, with a special focus on Eva Ushiromiya, Kinzo's first daughter. Unlike the first two chapters, the adults of the Ushiromiya family make a serious attempt to solve the riddle of the epitaph. Eva succeeds in this task and finds the gold, but a witch persona of Eva continues to carry out the murders in Beatrice's name.

Episode 4: Alliance of the Golden Witch (2008)
The chapter introduces Battler's sister Ange as a secondary protagonist, who survived the Rokkenjima massacre due to being absent and was taken in by the only survivor of the incident, Eva. It has a shifting focus of events, showing readers Ange's life in the aftermath of the incident and exploring her relationship with Maria and magic through Maria's diary. The Ange of 1998 sets out on a journey to uncover the truth of Rokkenjima, while the events on the Beatrice's gameboard repeat for the fourth time.

Chiru
 tells the second half of the story, delving deeper into the core of the mystery while providing more clues towards the truth of Rokkenjima. Each arc in this series contains all of the previous Chiru arcs.

 Episode 5: End of the Golden Witch (2009)
 This chapter introduces a new game master in the form of the witch Lambdadelta. Another witch, Bernkastel, takes primary control of the human side in the game. She introduces a new visitor to the island in the form of the detective Erika Furudo, who approaches the murders from a "mystery" perspective, unlike Battler who had taken an "anti-fantasy" stance. The chapter also has a focus on Natsuhi, who receives threatening phone calls from a "Man from 19 Years Ago".

 Episode 6: Dawn of the Golden Witch (2009)
 Having become the new game master, Battler Ushiromiya is tasked in this chapter with creating his gameboard as a way of demonstrating his understanding of Beatrice's game. Like Turn of the Golden Witch, Battler's game has a focus on the lovers, and also introduces a reborn Beatrice who struggles to discover the person she once was.

 Episode 7: Requiem of the Golden Witch (2010)
 This chapter presents an alternate reality where Battler does not come to Rokkenjima, the Golden Witch does not exist, and a mysterious child is now the designated successor to the Ushiromiya family. The protagonist is Willard H. Wright, who is tasked by Bernkastel to uncover the truth behind Beatrice. The chapter delves into the past experiences of several characters, including Kinzo and the person who would become Beatrice.

 Episode 8: Twilight of the Golden Witch (2010)
 The final chapter focuses on Ange Ushiromiya, who in her quest to discover the truth behind the events of the Rokkenjima incident is given the chance to go to Rokkenjima as a six-year-old by Battler. Unlike the previous chapters, this chapter has features that require direct interaction from the player, allowing the player to unlock extra scenes as well as make the choice between two endings.

Tsubasa
 (2010) is a compilation of short stories written by Ryukishi07 outside of the games, released on December 31, 2010 alongside Twilight of the Golden Witch. Several of the stories are humorous in tone, but the more serious ones are considered canon.

Hane
 (2011) consists of two additional short stories written by Ryukishi07: Jessica and the Killer Electric Fan and Forgery no.XXX. It was released on December 31, 2011 alongside Golden Fantasia Cross.

Saku
 (2019) is a collection of all previous official visual novel content for the series along with two additional scenarios. It was released on October 4, 2019.

An additional scenario that goes over the creation of the Beatrice's games, from the execution of the human solution to the adornment with fantasy. It was previously released in text form in the interview book Answer to the Golden Witch 2 (2011), and is recreated here in the visual novel format.

Episode 9: Last Note of the Golden Witch

Production

Development
Umineko When They Cry is the second visual novel series produced by 07th Expansion, the first being Higurashi no Naku Koro ni. The scenario writer for the series is Ryukishi07, who also drew all of the character illustrations. Game direction was handled by Ryukishi07's younger brother Yatazakura, and the overall management of the series was handled by BT until his death in July 2009. Image and text processing was headed by Jika, who took over BT's position of overall management. Background images and photography were provided by Yatazakura, Zekozakura, Mali., and All Season Kisetsu no Irodori. The games were designed using the game engine NScripter. The music of Umineko was provided by various music artists including both professionals and dōjin artists, and Dai, the composer of most of the music found in the answer arcs of Higurashi, also had a hand in the project as the music director. The word umineko is the name of a kind of seagull known as a Black-tailed gull. Naku means , specifically referring to those sounds made by non-human organisms. According to the original creator, Ryukishi07, the red character Na (な) in the logo is an official part of the title.

Release history

The first game of the Umineko When They Cry visual novel series, titled Legend of the Golden Witch, was first released on August 17, 2007 at Comiket 72. The second game Turn of the Golden Witch was released on December 31, 2007 at Comiket 73, and the third game Banquet of the Golden Witch was released on August 16, 2008 at Comiket 74. The fourth game Alliance of the Golden Witch was released on December 29, 2008 at Comiket 75. The first game in the Umineko no Naku Koro ni Chiru series, entitled End of the Golden Witch, was first released on August 15, 2009 at Comiket 76. The sixth game Dawn of the Golden Witch was released on December 30, 2009 at Comiket 77. The seventh game Requiem of the Golden Witch was released at Comiket 78 on August 14, 2010. The eighth game Twilight of the Golden Witch was released at Comiket 79 on December 31, 2010. A fan disc titled Umineko no Naku Koro ni Tsubasa was released the same day as Twilight. A second fan disc titled Umineko no Naku Koro ni Hane was released at Comiket 81 on December 31, 2011. MangaGamer released the Windows games on Steam and GOG.com in two parts, Question and Answer arcs, respectively. The release features original Ryūkishi07 sprites as well as new sprites by Kei Natsumi.

Taito released a version of Legend of the Golden Witch playable on certain mobile phones on March 31, 2009. The game is playable on FOMA 900 and i703 phones, using BREW as a runtime environment. A remake for the PlayStation 3, subtitled , was released by Alchemist on December 16, 2010. The release covers the original four games, and its features include a full HD rendition, all of the original soundtracks from the PC games, and full voice acting. Umineko no Naku Koro ni Chiru was similarly remade for the PlayStation 3, subtitled  and released by Alchemist on December 15, 2011. Both remakes were to be ported to the PlayStation Portable under the title , each to be released as two separate games. Rondo was split into Portable 1 (which covers Legend and Turn) and Portable 2 (which covers Banquet and Alliance), released on October 20 and November 17, 2011, respectively. Nocturne was to be split into Portable 3 (which was to cover End and Dawn), and Portable 4 (which was to cover Requiem and Twilight), but both games never came out. A dōjin 2D fighting game produced by 07th Expansion titled Golden Fantasia was released on December 31, 2010 at Comiket 79. An append disc, titled Golden Fantasia Cross, was released at Comiket 81 in December 2011. In addition, an Xbox 360 port of the original game developed by Alchemist was released on October 6, 2011 under the title Golden Fantasia X.

On November 3, 2018, developer Catbox Creative announced they would be launching a Kickstarter campaign for an updated version called Umineko When They Cry: Gold Edition, with an English dub. In the following weeks, they announced delays to launching the campaign. A compilation of all previous official visual novel content for the series along with two additional scenarios titled Umineko no Naku Koro ni Saku (lit. When the Seagulls Cry Bloom) was released on October 4, 2019 for Windows. A port of Saku for the PlayStation 4 and Nintendo Switch, subtitled  was released on January 28, 2021.

Adaptations

Manga

A manga version of Legend of the Golden Witch drawn by Kei Natsumi began serialization in the January 2008 issue of Square Enix's Gangan Powered, which was later transferred to the debut May 2009 issue of Gangan Joker after Gangan Powered was discontinued, and continued until the September 2009 issue. An adaptation of Turn of the Golden Witch drawn by Jirō Suzuki began serialization in the August 2008 issue of Square Enix's GFantasy. The manga adaptation of Banquet of the Golden Witch began serialization in the October 2009 issue of Gangan Joker and is illustrated by Kei Natsumi. Sōichirō draws the adaptation of Alliance of the Golden Witch, which began serialization in Square Enix's Internet-based magazine Gangan Online on October 1, 2009. The first bound volume for Legend of the Golden Witch was released in Japan on June 21, 2008 under Square Enix's Gangan Comics imprint. Yen Press licensed the various Umineko manga published by Square Enix for release in North America.

A four-panel comic strip entitled  and illustrated by Makoto Fugetsu was serialized in Ichijinsha's Manga Palette Lite magazine between March 1, 2008 and March 2, 2009. A single bound volume for Umineko Biyori was released on June 22, 2009. A cross-over manga drawn by Yuki Hiiro and featuring characters from Higurashi no Naku Koro ni titled Umineko no Naku Koro ni EpisodeX Rokkenjima of Higurashi crying was serialized in ASCII Media Works's Dengeki G's Festival! Comic magazine between January 26, 2009 and February 23, 2011. Two volumes of EpisodeX were released, the first on February 26, 2010 and the second on April 27, 2011 under ASCII Media Works' Dengeki Comics imprint. The manga's story takes place roughly during the start of Episode 4's game.

Drama CDs
Frontier Works began to produce a set of drama CDs for Umineko starting with the first volume  released on June 24, 2009. The second volume,  followed on July 23, 2009.<ref>{{cite web|url=https://www.amazon.co.jp/dp/B0029Y8VY2/|title='Umineko no Naku Koro ni drama CD volume 2 product listing|publisher=Amazon.co.jp|access-date=March 20, 2023|language=ja|archive-date=March 20, 2023|archive-url=https://web.archive.org/web/20230320120238/https://www.amazon.co.jp/dp/B0029Y8VY2/|url-status=live}}</ref> The voice cast is the same as the anime.

Novels

Kodansha Box released novelizations of the visual novel arcs, written by Ryukishi07 himself and illustrated by Tomohi, in two volume sets, beginning with Legend of the Golden Witch released on July 1, 2009 for volume one and August 4, 2009 for volume two. Fifteen volumes were released in total, with the last released on September 30, 2018, novelizing the last arc in one volume.

Anime

A 26-episode anime adaptation based on the visual novel series aired in Japan between July 2 and December 24, 2009 on Chiba TV, and aired on additional stations at later times. The anime is produced by the animation studio Studio Deen and directed by Chiaki Kon, with Toshifumi Kawase handling series scripts and Yoko Kikuchi designing the characters based on Ryūkishi07's original concepts. The singles for both songs were released on August 19 and September 16, 2009, respectively. The anime is licensed by NIS America for release in North America and was released in two Blu-ray Disc compilation volumes in December 2012.

Internet radio show
An Internet radio show titled Umineko no Naku Koro ni Episode R: Radio of the Golden Witch aired ten episodes between August 26, 2009 and January 13, 2010. Produced by Animate TV, the show was hosted by Sayaka Ohara (the voice of Beatrice in the anime adaptation) and featured numerous guests who were also voice actors from the anime such as Daisuke Ono (Battler) and Marina Inoue (Jessica). A special episode was later aired on April 28, 2010 featuring Rina Satō (Ange) and Ryukishi07 as guests. Two CD compilation volumes containing two CDs each were released on December 23, 2009 and January 27, 2010 compiling the ten main episodes.

Music
The visual novels have three opening theme songs. The four games of Umineko When They Cry use the opening theme , composed and performed by Akiko Shikata, which was released at Comiket 74 on August 15, 2008, and for public release on August 29, 2008 by Frontier Works. The first two games of Umineko no Naku Koro ni Chiru (End and Dawn) use the opening theme  sung by Ayumu from Zwei. The single for "Occultics no Majo" was released on November 26, 2009 by Geneon. The last two Chiru games (Requiem and Twilight) use the opening theme  sung by Nei Kino. The PlayStation 3 versions use different opening themes. Majo to Suiri no Rondo uses , sung by Kokomi. Shinjitsu to Gensō no Nocturne uses , sung by Ayumu from Zwei.

At the end of each game, there are two ending themes: one played after the completion of the main game (or, in some episodes, after the Tea Party) when the cast of characters is shown and another played after finishing the "????" epilogue when the staff credits are shown. In Legend of the Golden Witch, "Bring the Fate" composed by Hironori Doi is the first ending theme and  composed by -45 is used for the staff credits. Turn uses  composed by U2 Akiyama for the first ending theme and  sung by Kazumi Kimura for the staff credits. The first ending theme of Banquet is "Dread of the Grave (Rhythm ver.)" composed by SB Yune and the staff credits theme is "Active Pain" performed by Zakuro Motoki. The first ending theme for Alliance is "Discode" sung by Kanae Sakura and "Rōgoku Strip" is again used for the staff credits.End's first ending theme is  composed by -45 and the staff credits theme is  performed by Rekka Katakiri. Dawn uses "Birth of New Witch" sung by Zakuro Motoki as the first ending theme and  sung by Nei Kino for the staff credits. The first ending theme for Requiem is "The Executioner" composed by Zts and the staff credits theme  is sung by Kanae Sakura. Twilight has three ending themes, and differs depending on the ending chosen. For the trick ending, the theme used is "Umineko no Naku Koro ni" by Akiko Shikata. The staff credits theme is "Engage of Marionette" composed by Dai. An original soundtrack for Legend of the Golden Witch titled Essence'' was released on August 26, 2009.

Notes

References

External links

 
Umineko no Naku Koro ni Saku: Nekobako to Musō no Kōkyōkyoku official website (Entergram) 
Umineko no Naku Koro ni game portal site 
Anime official website 
Witch Hunt Translation Project

2007 manga
2007 video games
2009 Japanese novels
Fiction set in 1986
Anime television series based on video games
Dengeki Comics
Detective video games
Doujin video games
Gangan Comics manga
Ichijinsha manga
Japan-exclusive video games
Linux games
Kadokawa Shoten manga
MacOS games
Manga based on video games
Metafictional comics
Metafictional video games
Mobile games
Mystery video games
NBCUniversal Entertainment Japan
NScripter games
PlayStation 3 games
PlayStation Portable games
Ryukishi07
Seinen manga
Shōnen manga
Studio Deen
Video games developed in Japan
Video games about parallel universes
Visual novels
Windows games
Video games about witchcraft
Yen Press titles
Witchcraft in anime and manga
Television series about witchcraft
Witchcraft in written fiction